Harry Bedford (1866 – January 1929) was an English rugby union footballer who played in the 1880s and 1890s. He played at representative level for England, and at club level for Batley, and Morley as a forward, e.g. front row, lock, or back row. Prior to Thursday 29 August, Batley was a rugby union club.

Background
Harry Bedford was born in Gildersome, West Riding of Yorkshire, England, and he died aged 61 in Roundhay, Leeds, West Riding of Yorkshire, England.

Playing career

International honours
Harry Bedford won caps for England while at Batley in 1889 against New Zealand Natives, and in 1890 against Scotland, and Ireland.

In the early years of rugby football the goal was to score goals, and a try had zero value, but it provided the opportunity to try at goal, and convert the try to a goal with an unopposed kick at the goal posts. The point values of both the try and goal have varied over time, and in the early years footballers could "score" a try, without scoring any points.

Change of Code
When Batley converted from the rugby union code to the rugby league code on Thursday 29 August 1895, Harry Bedford would have been approximately 29 years of age. Subsequently, he was not both a rugby union and rugby league footballer for Batley.

Note
ESPN states Harry Bedford's year of birth as 1866, and date of death as January 1929, making him 62–63 at the time of his death. FreeBMD quotes his age at the time of death as 61, which would indicate an 1867 or 1868 birth.

References

External links
Search for "Bedford" at rugbyleagueproject.org
Biography of Arthur Budd with an England team photograph including Harry Bedford
Search for "Harry Bedford" at britishnewspaperarchive.co.uk

1866 births
1929 deaths
Batley Bulldogs players
England international rugby union players
English rugby union players
Rugby union players from Leeds
Morley R.F.C. players
Rugby union forwards